Germán Tozdjián (born 8 December 1964) is a Uruguayan weightlifter. He competed in the men's middle heavyweight event at the 1988 Summer Olympics.

References

1964 births
Living people
Uruguayan people of Armenian descent
Uruguayan male weightlifters
Olympic weightlifters of Uruguay
Weightlifters at the 1988 Summer Olympics
Place of birth missing (living people)